Pedro Filipe Tinoco Monteiro (born 30 January 1994) is a Portuguese professional footballer who plays for Georgian club FC Torpedo Kutaisi as a central defender.

Club career

Freamunde
Born in Paços de Ferreira, Monteiro finished his youth career with local club S.C. Freamunde. His first season as a senior was 2013–14, when he helped to promotion to the Segunda Liga as champions. He made his debut in the competition on 9 August 2014 in a 1–0 home win against Atlético Clube de Portugal, and scored his first goal the following 11 January to open the 3–0 victory over C.D. Trofense also at the Campo do SC Freamunde.

Braga
Monteiro was recalled by S.C. Braga in January 2015, from Freamunde where he was serving a loan. Being initially assigned to the reserve team, he played mostly with them also in the second division; his first match occurred on 8 February, in a 2–3 home loss to G.D. Chaves where he featured the full 90 minutes.

Monteiro made three competitive appearances at the Estádio Municipal de Braga; his Primeira Liga bow took place on 30 January 2015, in the 1–0 home defeat of Moreirense FC. Whilst under contract, he also served loans at Apollon Limassol FC (where he won the Cypriot Cup under his compatriot Pedro Emanuel) and F.C. Paços de Ferreira.

Estoril
On 10 July 2017, Monteiro joined G.D. Estoril Praia on a three-year deal. He scored his only goal in the top flight on 14 August, in a 3–0 home win over Vitória de Guimarães; the campaign ended in relegation.

Later career
Monteiro subsequently competed in the Portuguese second tier, with Leixões SC, C.D. Feirense and Académico de Viseu FC.

Honours
Freamunde
Campeonato Nacional de Seniores: 2013–14

Apollon Limassol
Cypriot Cup: 2015–16

Torpedo Kutaisi
Georgian Cup: 2022

References

External links

Portuguese League profile 

1994 births
Living people
People from Paços de Ferreira
Sportspeople from Porto District
Portuguese footballers
Association football defenders
Primeira Liga players
Liga Portugal 2 players
Segunda Divisão players
S.C. Freamunde players
S.C. Braga B players
S.C. Braga players
F.C. Paços de Ferreira players
G.D. Estoril Praia players
Leixões S.C. players
C.D. Feirense players
Académico de Viseu F.C. players
Cypriot First Division players
Apollon Limassol FC players
Erovnuli Liga players
FC Torpedo Kutaisi players
Portuguese expatriate footballers
Expatriate footballers in Cyprus
Expatriate footballers in Georgia (country)
Portuguese expatriate sportspeople in Cyprus